Nethakani, also known as Netkani,As Nethkani in Maharashtra,In the state of Telangana it is known as nethakaani. are a Maratha and Telugu caste of cotton weavers and laborers.

These people were migrated from Maharashtra and spread over middle India, Northern and southern parts of India. In Maharashtra Nethakanis are known as Netkani Traditionally they have been associated with the occupation of weaving (netha neyuta means "weaving" in Telugu), but they have now largely moved to cultivation and agricultural labor; with a few of them being small land-owners.

According to Bhadravathi Kalyana Natakamu, a folk-drama which has been published, the Nethakani are one among the four sections of Padmasaliyulu who are the sons of Bhavana Rushi. The four sections mentioned in this drama are Padmiyulu, Padmasakhiyulu, Padmasalikulu and Padmapulindulu. Padma-pulindulu was the Original Name of the Nethakani. From Padmapulindulu, the name became Chenethakanivaru, which in course of time changed to the present form, Nethakani. Nethakani people main occupation is handloom as well as village guards, Nirati,sunkari Employees.Nethakani People Kopiri is found in the forest and ropes are made. The beds are tangled with kopiri ropes And took the broom from the forest and came home and sold it in the towns to make a living.
Most of the people related to this caste are located in the northern region of the Indian state of Telangana in the districts of Adilabad, Karimnagar, Nizamabad, Khammam and Warangal. Nethakanis also migrated from Maharashtra and distributed throughout, they speak Marathi in Maharashtra & Adilabad bordering  MH. Based on the financial status in the society, Nethekanis are classified as Other Backward Class (OBC) in northern parts of India and scheduled caste (SC) in some parts of India.

This people are part of Hindu Shiva sampradaya. They are unique caste present in India. They speak Marati, Telugu, Kannada, Gujarati And Hindi

Their roots are from Brigu Maharshi and Markandeya sage and Bhawana rishi. Nethakani's are among the smaller SC castes in Telangana; a study estimated their population to be around 80,000, constituting about 1% of the state's total SC population. The Nethakanis are distinguished by their custom of tying their head cloth in a roughly square shape, and by their loin cloths, which are worn very loose and not knotted.
One of the Scheduled Castes is a Netakani caste.
   The Nethakani/Netkani community resides mostly in the Godavari River basin in the Adilabad Karimnagar Warangal Khammam districts of Telangana state.  The Nethakani people's migrated to Telangana from Maharashtra Most live in Chandrapur and Gadchiroli areas of Maharashtra and less in the Other areas.
  The main occupation of the Nethakani society in the past Weavers who made handloom textiles Weaving has disappeared over time.  This forced them to rely on other professions.  Mainly farm laborers and farm implements makers (e.g. plowing edlabandi, making) went into the forest to bring kopiri and make ropes with kopiri.  Line ropes, line ropes for bullock carts, reins for oxen, goats, tails, etc. were made.  The heads made of kopiri are called  nulaka and the beds were woven with this nulaka.  Linen beds are also known as  chenetha beds .It can be said that due to this weaving.

  During the British rule, the state of Hyderabad was ruled by the Nizam Nawabs with Aurangabad as the capital of Maharashtra.  The Nethakanis migrated to other parts of the country due to financial difficulties, some of which also came to the Telangana region.  They later started farming as agricultural laborers in the Telangana region so that their economic condition improved to some extent.

  Adilabad Warangal Agency areas in Khammam district such as Utnur, Asifabad, Aturunagaram Bhadrachalam are living with tribals in areas under ITDA.

  But the Nethakani  caste people who have been residing in the agency areas for many generations have no right to land, no education, no job, no political opportunities.  In a way the orphans living in the Agency area are said to be the poorest of the tribals in India. but the Nethakani people's are the ones who experience the poorest poverty than those tribes.

Cultural traditions of the non-weaving caste

  After the independence of India, the state of Hyderabad was divided into the state of Andhra Pradesh in the name of the linguistic states.  Due to this division, the non-weaver community on the other side of the Godavari river basin came into the state of Maharashtra and the weaver community. on the other side came under the joint state of Andhra Pradesh.  Non-Netakani or maharjati and Marathi in Maharashtra and Telugu spoken in the river basin as well as non-Netakani people now living in the border villages of Maharashtra. In Adilabad district in the state of Telangana.  Buddhist religious traditions are practiced.  In the villages in the Aheri Revenue Division area, the non-weaving community follows the religion of the Buddha, as well as the ideology of Ambedkar, and some Hindu traditions.  The Telugu language is mostly spoken by the Netakani community living in these areas.

References

Indian castes
Telugu society
Dalit communities